Zaire Blessing Wade (born February 4, 2002) is an American professional basketball player who plays for the Cape Town Tigers of the Basketball Africa League (BAL). He is the eldest child of the retired  professional basketball player Dwyane Wade.

Early life and high school career
Wade was born on February 4, 2002, in Chicago, Illinois, the son of retired NBA All-Star player Dwyane Wade.

For his freshman year of high school, Wade played basketball  Mount Carmel High School in Chicago, Illinois. Also on the team, nicknamed the Caravan, was his cousin Dahveon Morris. Both played on the school's freshman team. For Wade's next two years of high school he played basketball at American Heritage School in Plantation, Florida. On May 29, 2019, it was announced that Wade would transfer to Sierra Canyon School, a private K–12 school in Chatsworth, Los Angeles, for his 2019–20 senior year in high school.

After high school, he transferred to Brewster Academy in Wolfeboro, New Hampshire. Making basketball his focus and availing of Brewster's nationally prominent program, Wade garnered considerably more attention from college basketball coaches. He received scholarship offers from DePaul, Nebraska, Rhode Island and Toledo, but opted to turn professional instead.

Professional career

Salt Lake City Stars (2021–2022)
On October 23, 2021, Wade was selected with the 10th pick in the 2021 NBA G League draft by the Salt Lake City Stars. On March 12, 2022, he was moved to the short-term injured list by the team. On March 23, 2022, Wade was ruled out for the remainder of the year after suffering a season-ending injury.

Cape Town Tigers (2023–present)
On February 4, 2023, Wade signed with the Cape Town Tigers of the Basketball Africa League.

Career statistics

NBA G League

|-
| style="text-align:left;"| 2021–22
| style="text-align:left;"| Salt Lake City
| 12 || 1 || 18.6 || .267 || .188 || .667 || 2.5 || 1.3 || .8 || .4 || 1.8
|- class="sortbottom"
| style="text-align:center;" colspan="2"| Career
| 12 || 1 || 18.6 || .267 || .188 || .667 || 2.5 || 1.3 || .8 || .4 || 1.8

Personal life
Wade is the son of former National Basketball Association (NBA) player Dwyane Wade and Siohvaughn Funches.

References

External links
Sierra Canyon Trailblazers bio

2002 births
Living people
African-American basketball players
American men's basketball players
Basketball players from Chicago
Brewster Academy alumni
Cape Town Tigers players
Point guards
Salt Lake City Stars players
Shooting guards
Sierra Canyon School alumni